Takagi Station is the name of three train stations in Japan:

 Takagi Station (Hiroshima) (高木駅)
 Takagi Station (Toyama) (高儀駅)
 Takagi Station (Hyōgo) (高木駅) - closed